Shamshabad is a city in the Indian state of Telangana. It is located in Shamshabad mandal of Rajendranagar revenue division. Sri Vendikonda Siddalingeshwara Devastanam temple is sitauted in Siddulagutta Road in Shamshabad mandal. The international airport of Hyderabad is located here.

History
In former times the area was known as Sedanti village, which was later renamed Shamsabad in reference to Shams-ul-Umra, the title bestowed upon "Abul Fateh Khan", Tegh Jung, Shams-ud-Daula, Shams-ul-Mulk and Shams-ul-Umrah ("The Sun among the Nobles"), who founded the Paigah nobility during the reign of Nizam II, Mir Nizam Ali Khan (1762-1803). There was a time when the whole of the Shamsabad area were under the direct control of Paigah, including where the new airport has been built, the entire Shamsabad village was granted to Nawab Shams-ul-Umara Bahadur as a reward. Nawab Moin-Ud-Dowlah Bahadur Asman Jah, a leading Paigah noble, built a country home on a hillock and race course in Shamsabad for his own. As happened with other locality names, Shamsabad too got corrupted and over the years came to be called Shamshabad.

There is a railway station at Shamshabad by the name Umdanagar, which is part of the South Central Railway, Indian Railways.

Geography
It has an average elevation of 574 metres (1,886 ft).

Rajiv Gandhi International Airport
Shamshabad welcomes Rajiv Gandhi International Airport, which began operations 23 March 2008.

Metro station 
Hyderabad Airport Express Metro has a metro station planned near Fort Grand underpass in Shamshabad mandal.

Panchayats
There are 24 panchayats in the Shamshabad mandal.
Chinna Golkonda (village and panchayat)
Chinna Gollapally  (village and panchayat)
Ghansimiyaguda (village and panchayat)
Hamidullanagar (village and panchayat)
Jukal (village and panchayat)
Kacharam (village and panchayat)
Kavvaguda (village and panchayat)
Kothwalguda (village and panchayat)
Madanpally (village and panchayat)
Malkaram (village and panchayat)
Muchintal (village and panchayat)
Nanjapur (village and panchayat)
Narkhuda (village and panchayat)
Ootpally (village and panchayat)
Palamakole (village and panchayat)
Pedda Golkonda (village and panchayat)
Pedda Shapur (village and panchayat)
Pedda Tupra (village and panchayat)
Ramanujpur (village and panchayat)
Satamrai (village and panchayat)
Shamshabad (village and panchayat)
Shankarapur (village and panchayat)
Sultanpally (village and panchayat)
Tondpalli (village and panchayat)

References

External links

Villages in Ranga Reddy district